Vijayendra Varma is a 2004 Indian Telugu-language action film produced by Konda Krishnam Raju under Aditya Productions banner and directed by Swarna Subba Rao. It features Nandamuri Balakrishna, Laya, Sangeeta, Ankita , with the music composed by Koti. The film was panned both by critics and audience. The core plot of the movie was reported to be inspired by the 2002 movie The Bourne Identity.

Plot
An unnamed man (Balakrishna) lives with his wife (Laya), daughter, and in-laws. He does not have a name nor does he know who he is. He cannot remember anything that has happened 7 years before. However, he realizes that he possesses special combat skills whenever he comes across evil elements. When he forces his wife, to tell the truth, she reveals that he was found in the river in a mutilated state and he was taken care of by her. As the man goes to Hyderabad searching for his identity, a few incidents lead to the answer. He discovers that he is none other than the most respected and committed Indian Army Officer, Vijayendra Varma. The rest of the story is about how he retraces his past and saves the nation from Pakistani Jihadis.

Cast

 Nandamuri Balakrishna as Colonel Vijayendra Varma
 Laya
 Ankitha
 Sangeetha
 Mukesh Rishi as Aslam Khan (Pakistan Terrorist Leader)
 Ashish Vidyarthi as Naanaji
 Brahmanandam  
 Ahuti Prasad
 Chalapathi Rao
 M. Balayya
 Bhupendra Singh
 M. S. Narayana  
 Manorama
 Ralyalakshmi 
 Venu Madhav
 Giri Babu 
 Raghu Babu 
 Sudhakar
 Narra Venkateswara Rao 
 Lakshmipathi
 Satya Prakash
 Surya 
 Mohan Raj
 Shob Raj 
 Delhi Rajeswari
 Banda Jyothy 
 Shoba Rani 
 Ooma Chowdary 
 Master Tanush 
 Baby Kavya

Soundtrack

Music composed by Koti.

References

External links

2004 films
2000s Telugu-language films
2004 action films
Indian action films
Indian Army in films
Films scored by Koti
Indian remakes of American films
India–Pakistan relations in popular culture